Poornima Shrestha (born 6 September 1960 as Sushma Shrestha), is an Indian playback singer. Starting as a child singer, she later reinvented into a leading playback singer in Bollywood during the 1990s. 

She started her career as a child singer in Andaz (1971) under music director duo Shankar Jaikishan for the hit song "Hai Na Bolo Bolo" alongside Mohammed Rafi and Suman Kalyanpur. Throughout her childhood, she then worked with music composers of the golden era including Naushad, Madan Mohan, C. Ramchandra, Salil Choudhury, Anil Biswas, S.D. Burman, Kalyanji-Anandji and Laxmikant–Pyarelal. Poornima formed a successful collaboration with R.D. Burman with such popular numbers, "Tera Mujhse Hai Pehle" from Aa Gale Lag Jaa (1973) and "Kya Hua Tera Vada" from Hum Kisise Kum Naheen (1977); both earned her nominations for the Filmfare Best Female Playback Award becoming the youngest nominee in the category at the age of 11.

She made a comeback as an adult singer when music director duo Anand–Milind collaborated with her for the superhit song "Tu Tu Tara" in Bol Radha Bol (1992). Their collaboration throughout the 1990s gave her a string of hits. She has also collaborated with many music directors in her four decades long singing career including Bappi Lahiri, Rajesh Roshan, M. S. Vishwanathan, Ravindra Jain, Anu Malik, Jatin–Lalit, Raamlaxman, Nadeem-Shravan, M.M.Kreem, Viju Shah, Anand Raj Anand, Nikhil-Vinay, Vishal–Shekhar and Aadesh Shrivastava.

Apart from Hindi songs, Poornima has sung in many languages including Bengali, Nepali, Marathi, Bhojpuri, Punjabi, Gujarati, Oriya, Rajasthani, Assamese, Haryanvi, Garhwali and Arabic. Apart from films, she has sung numerous non-film songs in various genres like Baal Geet (children's songs), Bhavgeet, Bhajan, Ghazal, Chutney and Indipop.

Personal life

Hailing from the Nepali Newar community, Poornima was born in Mumbai. Her father was music composer Bholanath Shrestha, who worked primarily with Hindi film music directors. He was from Kathmandu, Nepal before settling in Kolkata and eventually in Mumbai. She lost her father on 12 April 1971 when she was barely 11 years old.
In an interaction with a YouTube channel, she has admitted to “almost giving up on her career for family”. She has a son Nishadh Chandra who is a music composer.

Career

She sang the hit "Hai Na Bolo Bolo" when she was just nine. She got her first break accidentally when Chandrakant Bhosle, a family friend and an assistant to Shankar–Jaikishan recommended her name to Shankar. In spite of the prevailing custom of women playback singers singing for children, Shankar took upon him the challenge of taking an unknown child to sing "Hai Na Bolo Bolo" for the film Andaz. Sushama recorded her first song on 11 November 1969 with Mohammed Rafi and Suman Kalyanpur.
Considered as first successful child singer in Hindi films Sushma did a children's album called Bal Geet, which had the legendary S.Khale composing the songs and Shanta Shelke penning them. She sang four songs in it. The album proved as huge hit and gave immense exposure to Poornima who surprised everybody by singing Marathi songs with ease. Her career was planned to be launched at a function organised by the Punjab Association organised by Raj Kapoor, Pran and others. Slated to perform on 12 April 1971, tragedy struck on 11 April when her father suffered a cardiac arrest and died. She was undaunted and was encouraged by family and friends. She gave a performance, which impressed many and enabled her to get a scholarship of Rs. 250 to study music. She has sung many super hit songs in her childhood: "Tera Mujhse Hai Nata Koi", "Jaane Tu Ya Jaane Na", "Yaadon Ki Baarat" are a few. Poornima is the oldest singer in terms of experience in the industry who can boast of having worked with Naushad, Madan Mohan, C. Ramchandra, Anil Biswas, S.D. Burman and Shankar Jaikishan.

Music director R.D. Burman gave her some of the most memorable songs of her career, "Ek Din Bik Jayega Mati Ki Mol", "Yaadoon Ki Baaraat", "Teri Hai Zameen Tera Aasman", "Tera Mujhse Hai Pehle" and "Kya Hua Tera Vada"; the later two earned her nominations for the Filmfare Best Female Playback Award becoming the youngest nominee in the category at the age of 11. She has acknowledged his contribution in her singing career:

A popular child singer through the 1970s and early 1980s, she struggled to breakthrough as an adult singer during the mid 80s. Her marriage also put a temporary halt to her singing career with regard to films as she stopped doing stage shows, which promptly dried up the offers for playback. Her last song as Sushma Shreshtha was in N.Chandra's Ankush: "Itni Shakti Humein Dena Data" (along with main singer Pushpa Pagdhare – in Hindi movie Ankush filmed on Ashalata Wabgaonkar, Nana Patekar, Suhas Palshikar and others). Jingles took her attention where the professionalism made her settle to a steady work schedule.

In the 1990s, Tips, the music company approached her with an offer. Wanting to make a clean departure from the child prodigy image, they suggested a change of name and image. Sushma took the name Poornima. Her song "Barsaat Mein Jab Aayega Saawan Ka Maheena" from Maa was a hit. Few things changed till David Dhawan's Bol Radha Bol. "Tu Tu Tu Tu Tara" was nothing short of an anthem and the remaining songs, which were a success also, gave Poornima the opportunity to savour success and adulation that had eluded for long. She continued her association with Dhawan, she went on to sing for all his No. 1 series including Haseena Maan Jayegi and Biwi No.1.
 
She has sung for many music directors including Naushad, Madan Mohan, C. Ramchandra, Anil Biswas, S.D. Burman, Shankar Jaikishan, Kalyanji-Anandji, Chitragupt, Laxmikant-Pyarelal, Bappi Lahiri, Rajesh Roshan, M. S. Vishwanathan, Ravindra Jain, Anand-Milind, Anu Malik, Jatin–Lalit, Raamlaxman, Nadeem-Shravan, M.M.Kreem, Lesle Lewis, Viju Shah, Anand Raj Anand, Nikhil-Vinay, Vishal–Shekhar, Dilip Sen -Sameer Sen, Sukhwinder Singh, Ghulam Ali, Jeet-Pritam, Aadesh Shrivastava and Mani Sharma. Shrestha has sung popular numbers like "Channe Ke Khet Main" from Anjaam, "Batti Na Bujha" from Gopi Kishan (both 1994), "Shaam Hain Dhuan Dhuan" from Diljale (1996), "Mr Lova Lova" from Ishq (1999) and in a series of David Dhawan films like such as Coolie No. 1 (1995), Judwaa (1997), Hero No. 1 (1997) and Biwi No.1 (1999) amongst others.

She has sung for many actresses like Sridevi, Jaya Prada, Juhi Chawla, Madhuri Dixit, Sarika, Manisha Koirala, Simi Garewal, Deepti Naval, Ramya Krishnan, Rambha, Sushmita Sen, Shilpa Shirodkar, Karishma Kapoor, Raveena Tandon, Kajol, Rani Mukherji, Madhu, Tabu, Preity Zinta, Ayesha Jhulka, Shilpa Shetty, Sonali Bendre and Mamta Kulkarni.

In spite of the lacklustre Indi-pop scene in late 90s, Poornima was one of the top-ten selling artistes with her album Mera Dil Bole Piya Piya. Throughout the 1990s, Shrestha along with Alka Yagnik and Kavita Krishnamurthy were the most prolific playback singers for heroines

Not active in film playback singing, she is now doing stage shows in India and different parts of the world.

Television

Poornima was one of the judges in the third season of singing reality show Bharat Ki Shaan: Singing Star, which aired on Doordarshan in primetime. She was also a judge in Bhojpuri language singing reality show Zilla Top which aired on Mahuaa TV.

Awards and nominations

 1973: Government of Maharashtra - Awarded for support to educational relief
 1974: Filmfare Best Female Playback Award - Tera Mujhse Hai Pehle (Aa Gale Lag Jaa) - Nominated
 1978: Filmfare Best Female Playback Award - Kya Huwa Tera Vada (Hum Kisise Kum Naheen) - Nominated
 1998: Zee Cine Award - Best Playback Singer (Female) – Sona Kitna Sona Hain (Hero No. 1) - Nominated
 2017: Mohammad Rafi Award - Presented by Vice President of India
 2020: Global Film and Music Festival - Lifetime Achievement Award

Selected discography

Non-film albums
 Balgeet (Composer - Shrinivas Khale)
 Hasa Milano Hasa Baal Geete (Composer - C. Ramachandra)
 Marathi Disco
 Gujarati Geet
 Chutney Garbar
 Simply Darun
 Ankh Micholi
 Balma Bada Bavaali
 Jaal
 Bhatta Saheb
 Badal
 Jogan
 Patanga
 Shagufa
 Hello Hi
 Maashuka Bulbul (Composer - Lesle Lewis)
 Maiya Naiyya Taar Le
 Maiya Bhavani
 Maa Ka Darshan
 Chalo Darbar
 Shudhu Monay Rekho
 Chutney Garbar
 Mera Dil Bole Piya Piya
 Beti Chalal Sasurar
 Bijuri Kaha Giri
 Navrya Ghari Maajhi Lekh Chal
 Sun Sharabi
 Ae Samdhi Ke Bete
 Abbe Daalab
 Tohke Chadhaib Laal Ohaar
 Goriya
 Sawan Aya Re
 Aartiyan

Film

References

External links

1960s births
Living people
20th-century Indian singers
20th-century Indian women singers
21st-century Indian singers
21st-century Indian women singers
Bollywood playback singers
Indian Gorkhas
Indian people of Nepalese descent
Indian women playback singers
Indian women singers
Marathi-language singers
Nepali-language singers from India
Singers from Mumbai